Alberta Provincial Highway No. 633, commonly referred to as Highway 633, is a highway in the province of Alberta, Canada. It runs west-east from Highway 757 just north of Highway 16 to Highway 2 (St. Albert Trail) in St. Albert.  It runs through the summer villages on the north side of Isle Lake, and the south side of Lac Ste. Anne. It is also known as Villeneuve Road between Villeneuve and St. Albert.

Major intersections 
Starting from the west end of Highway 633:

See also

 List of Alberta provincial highways

References

External links

633
Roads in St. Albert, Alberta